The University of Maryland Art Gallery is the flagship art museum on the campus of the University of Maryland, College Park. The Gallery is a member of the American Alliance of Museums, Association of Academic Museums and Galleries, and the National Art Education Association.

History 
Founded in 1965, the University of Maryland Art Gallery was initially housed in the Tawes Fine Arts Building before moving to a newly constructed exhibition facility in the Art-Sociology Building in 1976. On October 9, 2015, it was announced that the Board of Regents of the University System of Maryland (USM) unanimously approved the naming of the Art-Sociology Building to the Parren J. Mitchell Art-Sociology Building after the late Congressman.

Collections 
The Gallery's permanent collection contains nearly 3,000 objects including prints, drawings, paintings, sculptures, photographs and time-based media. Among the prominent artists who have had exhibits showcased at the Gallery are John Baldessari, Louis Faurer, Chip Lord, Conrad Marca-Relli, and Ian Hornak.

References

External links
 University Libraries, University of Maryland website
 University of Maryland website

University of Maryland, College Park
Art museums and galleries in Maryland
University museums in Maryland
Contemporary art galleries in the United States
Museums in Prince George's County, Maryland
Art museums established in 1965
1965 establishments in Maryland